is a Japanese football club based in Miyazaki, the capital city of Miyazaki Prefecture. They play in the J3 League.

History 
Born in 1965 as Kadokawa Club, the club have twice changed their name; first they became Andiamo Kadokawa 1965 in 2004 and then MSU (Miyazaki Sportsmen United) FC in 2007. The current name came only in January 2015: Tegevajaro is a mix formed by tege, the Miyazaki dialect pronunciation of the word sugoi ("cool, amazing") and the Spanish words vaca and pájaro (which mean "cow" and "bird"). In the logo, you can also visualize the Miyazaki-jingū.

Tegevajaro Miyazaki aspired to join the J. League; they first aimed for the J3 League in 2017 season, but their first target was to reach the Japan Football League. Nobuhiro Ishizaki was chosen in 2017 to coach the club, while former J1 League players Yasuhito Morishima and Keiji Takachi signed for the team.

In the 2020 season, Tegevajaro finished in second position and were promoted to J3 for the first time in the club's history for the 2021 season.

League & cup record 
The results are the ones under the current denomination.

Key

Honours 
Kyushu Soccer League
 Champions (1st): 2017

Current squad 
As of 14 January 2023.

Coaching staff 
For the 2023 season.

Managerial history

Kit evolution

References

External links 
Official Site 

 
Football clubs in Japan
Sports teams in Miyazaki Prefecture
Miyazaki (city)
Association football clubs established in 1965
1965 establishments in Japan
Japan Football League clubs
J.League clubs